Coleophora millefolii is a moth of the family Coleophoridae. It is found in most of Europe, except Great Britain, Ireland and the Iberian Peninsula.

Adults are on wing from the end of June to August.

The larvae feed on Achillea millefolium. They create a compact, sausage-shaped, hairy case, built out of numerous leaf fragments. The mouth angle is about 45°. Larvae can be found from autumn to June.

References

millefolii
Moths described in 1849
Moths of Europe